Peter Traub (born 1974 in South Africa) is an American composer of electronic and acoustic music and sound installations. His work often focuses on the use of technology to mediate physical and virtual spaces.

Biography 

Traub was born in Johannesburg, South Africa in 1974, emigrating to the United States with his family in 1982. Although he lacked a musical upbringing and did not play an instrument, Traub discovered the possibilities of electronic music during his undergraduate work at the University of Florida. Studying with Dr. James Paul Sain, he wrote his first pieces of electronic music at the Florida Electroacoustic Music Studio from 1995 - 1997. In 1997, Traub entered the Masters Program in Electro-Acoustic Music at Dartmouth College. There, he studied for two years with Jon Appleton, Charles Dodge, Eric Lyon, Larry Polansky, and Christian Wolff. His Masters Thesis was the Internet sound installation, bits & pieces (1999). After leaving Dartmouth, Traub move to the San Francisco Bay Area where he worked for various internet startups until 2004. While there, he also spent time composing at Stanford University's Center for Computer Research in Music and Acoustic.

In 2004, Traub moved to Charlottesville, Virginia to begin Ph.D. work at The Virginia Center for Computer Music. There, he studied with Matthew Burtner, Ted Coffey, and Judith Shatin until completing his Ph.D. in 2010. Since 2007 Traub has also been a guest contributor to the Networked_Music_Review, a blog that focuses on art and music that incorporates computer networks. His primary contributions to the blog are interviews with established new media artists such as Bill Fontana, Max Neuhaus, Janet Cardiff and George Bures Miller, and Golan Levin.

On February 25, 2008,  NPR's mid-day news show, "Day to Day" featured a segment on his online sound installation, ItSpace 

Samples of his work can be heard on his website, petertraub.net

Selected Concert Works and Installations 
 Curve (2010), site-specific sound installation for a long curved wall
 Study No. 1 for Bodies, Metal, and Air (2010), collaboration with choreographer Dinah Grah
 Solera: for sound, site, and time (2009), site-specific sound installation
 convergence (2007), for multichannel tape
 nodes (2006), for violin, oboe, and network-connected spaces
 ground loops (2005), for solo percussion and internet feedback
 points of interest (2005), for solo trombone
 bassoonism (2004), for solo bassoon
 portfoliosis (2003), eight-channel  computer generated tape
 retour (2002), eight-channel computer generated tape
 cable (1999), computer generated tape
 experiment on unknown sample (1999), processed internet sound
 Jonestown (1999), tambourine, voice, and real-time computer processing
 trilogy (1998), computer generated tape
 water retention (1996), computer generated tape

Network Art 
 WoodEar (2013) , a generative sound and video installation using live sensor data from a tree. Video in collaboration with Jennifer Lauren Smith.
 ItSpace (2007) , an online participatory sound installation using MySpace.com
 Sibling Revelry (2001)  web-based interactive sound installation, collaboration with Gregory Traub
 NetSong (2000)  web-based sound installation for synthesized voice and search engine, collaboration with Amy Alexander
 bits & pieces (1999)  web-based sound installation for processing and collaging internet audio samples

External links 
 Traub's website
 Networked_Music_Review
 The Virginia Center for Computer Music
 NPR's "Day to Day" features ItSpace
 Review of Solera in C-Ville

Modern artists
American contemporary artists
American male composers
21st-century American composers
American experimental musicians
Dartmouth College alumni
University of Florida alumni
Living people
1974 births
21st-century American male musicians